Elisabeth Joris (born 1946 in Visp, Valais) is a Swiss historian.

Biography
Joris grew up in Visp and has lived in Zurich since 1966. She studied history and history of French literature at the University of Zurich and earned a licentiate degree under the direction of Rudolf Braun in 1980.

Joris co-founded the group Kritisches Oberwallis and the critical newspaper . She worked as an elementary school teacher, and edited several works about women's and gender history in Switzerland. In 1986, she published a pioneering source book about women's history in Switzerland alongside Heidi Witzig. In 2010, she earned a doctorate at the University of Zurich. Joris was a co-editor of the feminist magazine Olympe.

Joris is married and mother of two.

Publications (selection) 
 As an author
 Elisabeth Seiler-Joris, Sozialer Wandel im Oberwallis in der zweiten Hälfte des neunzehnten Jahrhunderts. Zurich: 1979 (licentiate thesis, University of Zurich, 1980).
 with Heidi Witzig: Brave Frauen, aufmüpfige Weiber: Wie sich die Industrialisierung auf Alltag und Lebenszusammenhänge von Frauen auswirkte (1820–1940). Zurich: Chronos, 1992.
 with Adrian Knoepfli: Eine Frau prägt eine Firma: Zur Geschichte von Firma und Familie Feller. Zürich: Chronos, 1996.
 Liberal und eigensinnig: Die Pädagogin Josephine Stadlin – die Homöopathin Emilie Paravicini-Blumer. Handlungsspielräume von Bildungsbürgerinnen im 19. Jahrhundert. Zurich: Chronos, 2010 (dissertation, University of Zurich, 2010).

 As an editor
 with Heidi Witzig: Frauengeschichte(n): Dokumente aus zwei Jahrhunderten zur Situation der Frauen in der Schweiz. Zürich Limmat, 1986.
 with Katrin Rieder and : Tiefenbohrungen: Frauen und Männer auf den grossen Tunnelbaustellen der Schweiz, 1870–2005. Baden: Hier + jetzt, 2006.
Baden: Hier + jetzt, 2008.
 with Renate Wegmüller: „Stimmen, wählen und gewählt zu werden sei hinfort unsere Devise und unser Ziel“. Kurze Geschichte des Frauenstimmrechts in Quellen. Wettingen, eFeF, 2011.
 with Rita Schmid: Damit der Laden läuft. Ein kritischer Blick in die scheinbar vertraute Welt des Detailhandels. Zürich: Rotpunktverlag, 2019.

References

External links
 
 
 

20th-century Swiss historians
Swiss women historians
Swiss editors
Swiss women editors
Women's historians
21st-century Swiss historians
Swiss newspaper editors
Swiss magazine editors
Swiss feminists
Feminist historians
University of Zurich alumni
1946 births
People from Valais
Writers from Zürich
Living people
Women magazine editors